Charles Harrison may refer to:

Charles Harrison (artist) (1942-2009), British Conceptual artist & member of the artist group Art & Language
Charles Harrison (Australian politician) (1915–1986), member of the South Australian House of Assembly
Charles Harrison (basketball) (1933–2014), American basketball player
Charles Harrison (Bewdley MP) (1830–1888), Liberal MP for Bewdley, 1874–1880
Charles Harrison (British politician) (1835–1897), leading member of London County Council and Liberal MP for Plymouth
Charles Harrison (Canadian politician) (1794–1879), politician in New Brunswick, Canada
Charles Harrison (general) (1740–1793), American soldier and uncle of President William Henry Harrison
Charles Harrison (musician) (born 1974), British organist
Charles Harrison (RAF officer) (1888–1922), World War I flying ace
Charles B. Harrison (1824–1901), farmer and political figure in New Brunswick, Canada
Charles "Chuck" Harrison (1931–2018), industrial designer at Sears, Roebuck and Company
Charles Custis Harrison (1844–1929), provost of the University of Pennsylvania
Charles Lee Harrison (1921–2015), American Marine held as a prisoner of war in both World War II and the Korean War
Charles Robert Harrison (1868–1946), Canadian politician
Charles Townsend Harrison (1942–2009), British art historian
Charles W. Harrison (1878–1965), American tenor
Charles Yale Harrison (1898–1954), American-Canadian novelist and journalist